Augustus Percy "Gus" Officer (15 September 1875 – 25 February 1935) was an Australian rules footballer who played with Essendon in the Victorian Football League (VFL).

Notes

External links 

1875 births
1935 deaths
Australian rules footballers from Victoria (Australia)
Australian Rules footballers: place kick exponents
Essendon Football Club players